Shlomo ben Yitzchak HaLevi (1532–1600) was a prominent rabbinic scholar in Thessaloniki, Greece, during the Jewish community's "Golden Age." Among his other duties, he served the exiled Jews from Évora, Portugal.

His grandson, Shlomo ben Yitzchak HaLevi II, most well known for his responsa Maharash Levi (or Maharash L'veit HaLevi), published in Thessaloniki in 1652. These responsa are arranged according to the four-volume structural model of the Arba'ah Turim, and have been cited by such later rabbinic authorities as Rabbi Avraham Gombiner in his Magen Avraham.

References 

Rabbinic legal texts and responsa
Rabbis from Thessaloniki
16th-century rabbis from the Ottoman Empire
Levites
1600 deaths
1532 births